Aliens Stole My Body is a 2020 American adventure science fiction comedy film directed by Sean McNamara and based on Bruce Coville's novel of the same name. This film stars an ensemble cast, led by Jayden Greig, George Takei, Dan Payne and Alex Zahara.

The film premiered on Netflix on August 4, 2020, in the United States. It is the sequel to the 2018 film Aliens Ate My Homework.

Plot
When the crew of the Ferkel learn that BKR has escaped from prison, they return to Earth to recruit Deputies Rod Allbright and Elspeth McMasters in their quest to foil his villainous plans. With Rod's friend Mickey tagging along, the heroes of the Galactic Patrol travel to the planet Mentat to rescue Rod's father, whose knowledge BKR needs to help him trap the entire galaxy in a single moment in time. The entire Allbright family gets involved in a final showdown at the edge of a black hole.

Cast 
 Jayden Greig as Rod Allbright
 George Takei as the voice of Phil the Plant
 Dan Payne as Grakker
 Tristan Risk as Madame Pong
 Alex Zahara as Tar Gibbons
 Lauren McNamara as Elspeth McMasters
 Sean Quan as Mickey
 Ty Consiglio as Billy Becker
 Sandy Robson as Art Allbright
 Kirsten Robeck as Gwen Allbright
 Christian Convery as Eric Allbright
 Carmela Guizzo as Linda Allbright
 Travis Turner as Lackey
 Christina Meredith Lewell as Arly Bung
 Brad Proctor as Phil the Plant puppeteer
 Jason Ward as Tar Gibbons/Plink puppeteer
 Phillip Mitchell as Stunt Guard #1
 Douglas Armstrong as Stunt Guard #2

Nearly the entire cast of Aliens Ate My Homework returns, although William Shatner is replaced by fellow Star Trek alumnus George Takei. Takei says his trademark line, "Oh Myyy," during the movie's climax. Bruce Coville cameos as a neighbor of the Allbright's who witnesses the arrival of the Ferkel, alongside two other neighborhood children who are reading a copy of the original Aliens Stole My Body book.

Differences from the book
Unlike its predecessor, which faithfully adapted the story of a single novel, the film combines various plot points of the third and fourth books of the Rod Allbright Alien Adventures—The Search for Snout, and the movie's namesake, Aliens Stole My Body—into a single story, while adding many original elements of its own.

References

External links 
 

Films directed by Sean McNamara
Films about extraterrestrial life